Pleurotomella hypermnestra is a species of sea snail, a marine gastropod mollusk in the family Raphitomidae.

Description
The length of the shell attains 6 mm, its diameter 2 mm.

The  small, pale, straw-white shell has a fusiform shape.  It contains eight whorls. The three whorls in the protoconch are ochreous and smooth. The subsequent whorls are impressed at the suture. The longitudinal ribs are not numerous (about ten in the body whorl). The few spiral lirae are undeveloped. The oblong- quadrate interstices are depressed. The aperture is oblong, incrassate and straw-white on its interior. The sinus is wide and not deep. The siphonal canal is short. The columella is rather straight and simple.

Distribution
This marine species occurs in the Persian Gulf.

References

External links
 

hypermnestra
Gastropods described in 1912